Atlético, Spanish for athletics, or Athletico in English, may refer to:

Sports Teams

Athletico
Athletico SC (Lebanon), a Lebanese football academy
Athletic Bilbao, or Atletico Bilbao, Basque students athletic club (also forming Athletic Club Madrid, which later evolved into Atlético Madrid)
Athlético Marseille (formerly Groupe Sportif Consolat and sometimes referred to as Marseille Consolat), French amateur football club 
Avendale Athletico, South African football club from Cape Town

Atletico / Atlético
Atlético Albacete, Spanish football team based in Albacete, in the autonomous community of Castile-La Mancha
Atletico Arezzo, or S.S. Arezzo, Italian association football club based in Arezzo, Tuscany
Atlético Arteixo, Spanish football team based in Arteixo, A Coruña, in the autonomous community of Galicia
Atlético Astorga FC, Spanish football team based in Astorga in the autonomous community of Castile and León
Atlético Bahía, Mexican football club in the Liga Premier – Serie A, based in San José del Valle, Bahía de Banderas, Nayarit, Mexico
Atletico Baja, Mexican indoor soccer franchise playing in the Southwestern Division of the Major Arena Soccer League, representing the Mexican city of Tijuana
Atlético Belén, Peruvian football club based in the city of Moyobamba, San Martín
Atlético Bello, earlier Colombian football team, based in the Metropolitan Medellín sector of Bello
Atlético Boxing Club, Argentine football club located in the city of Río Gallegos, Santa Cruz
Atlético Bucaramanga, Colombian football team based in Bucaramanga
Atlético Chalaco, Peruvian football club based in Callao
Atlético Calatayud, Spanish football team based in Calatayud in the community of Aragon
Atlético Cali, or Atlético F.C., Colombian football team based in Cali
Atlético Capitalino Fútbol Club, Mexican football team based in Mexico City
Atlético Celaya, earlier Mexican football club from Celaya, Guanajuato
Atlético Chiapas, Mexican football club that played in the Segunda División de México, but is now called Chiapas F.C. Premier Reserves
Atlético Chiriquí, Panamanian football team playing in Liga Panameña de Fútbol
Atlético Choloma, Honduran football club that plays its home games at Estadio Rubén Deras in Choloma, Cortés
Atlético Ceuta, or officially AD Ceuta FC, after a merge between Sociedad Deportiva Ceuta and Atlético Tetuán, under the name of Club Atlético de Ceuta, Spanish football club in Cueta 
Atlético Echagüe, Argentine basketball team located in Paraná, Entre Ríos
Atlético Ensenada Fútbol Club, earlier Mexican football team based in Ensenada, Baja California
Atlético Español F.C., earlier Mexican football team which played between 1971 and 1982 in the Primera División de México
Atlético Frigorífico, earlier Peruvian football club, located in the city of Lima
Atlético Grau, Peruvian football club, playing in the city of Piura, Peru
Atlético Huila, Colombian football team based in Neiva
Atlético Infop, earlier Honduran football club based in Choloma, Hondura
Atlético Jalisco, Mexican football team based in Guadalajara, Jalisco
Atlético Juventud Girardot, earlier Colombian football team, based in Girardot, Colombia
Atlético Junior, or simply as Junior, Colombian football team
Atletico de Kolkata, now known as ATK, Indian football club in Kolkata, India  
Atlético de Lugones SD, Spanish football club based in Lugones in the autonomous community of Asturias
Atlético Limeño, Honduran football club that plays its home games at Estadio Milton Flores in La Lima, Cortés
Atlético Lusitania, earlier Peruvian football club, playing in the city of Barrios Altos, Lima District, Lima
Atlético Madrid or Club Atlético de Madrid, S.A.D., or simply as Atlético, Atléti, or Atleti, a Spanish professional football club based in Madrid, that play in the Spanish La Liga
Atlético Madrid B, Spanish football team based in Madrid, in the community of Madrid, founded 1963, the reserve team of Atlético Madrid and currently plays in Segunda División B – Group 1with home games at Cerro del Espino Stadium 
Atlético Madrid C, earlier Spanish football club that played in the Tercera División and played their home games at the Nuevo Cerro del Espino
Atletico Madrid Balonmano, or BM Neptuno, or merger of Club Balonmano Neptuno/Atlético Madrid, earlier Spanish handball team based in Madrid, Spain (2011 to 2013)
Atlético Madrid BM, earlier Spanish handball team that was part of the Atlético sports organization (1951 to 1994)
Atlético Madrid Femenino, Spanish women's football team based in Madrid
Atlético Madrid Rugby, Spanish rugby union section of the Spanish club Atlético Madrid. Established in 1914
Atlético Madrid (youth), or Atlético de Madrid Juvenil, the under-19 team of Spanish professional football club Atlético Madrid
Atlético Malagueño, Spanish football team based in Málaga
Atlético Minero, Peruvian football club based in Matucana, located in the Department of Lima
Atlético Malabo, Equatoguinean football club based in Malabo
Atlético Mancha Real, Spanish football team based in Mancha Real in the autonomous community of Andalusia
Atlético Monzón, Spanish football team based in Monzón, in the autonomous community of Aragon.
Atlético Morazán, earlier Honduran football club. It was based in Tegucigalpa, Honduras
Atlético Morelia, Mexican football club based in Morelia, Michoacán
Atlético Municipal, Honduran football club based in Santa Cruz de Yojoa
Atlético Nacional, Colombian professional football team based in Medellín
Atlético Nacional (Honduras), Honduran football club based in Villanueva, Honduras
Atletico Nacional (Panama), earlier Panamanian football team founded in 1995 and disbanded in 2001
Atlético Navalcarnero, Spanish Primera División women's futsal club based in Navalcarnero
Atlético Olympic FC, Burundian football club located in Bujumbura, Burundi
Atlético Onubense, Spanish football team based in Huelva, in the autonomous community of Andalusia
Atlético Orinoco, Venezuelan football club from Ciudad Guayana
Atlético Ouriense, Portuguese women's football club from Ourém, Portugal
Atlético Ottawa, Canadian soccer club based in Ottawa, Ontario
Atlético Pantoja, Domican football team based in Santo Domingo, Dominican Republic
Atlético Peruano, earlier Peruvian football club, located in the district of Rímac, Lima
Atlético Petróleos de Luanda, best known as Petro Atlético de Luanda, or simply Petro Atlético or Petro de Luanda, traditional football club from Luanda, Angola
Atlético Petróleos de Luanda (basketball), Angolan basketball club
Atletico Piombino, Italian football club located in Piombino, Tuscany
Atlético Policial, Argentine football club, located in San Fernando del Valle de Catamarca
Atlético Progresso Clube, commonly known as Progresso, Brazilian football club based in Mucajaí, Roraima state
Atlético de Rafaela, Argentine sports club from the city of Rafaela
Atlético Reynosa, Mexican football club based in the city of Reynosa, Tamaulipas
Atlético Roraima Clube, also known as Atlético Roraima, or just Roraima, Brazilian football team from Boa Vista, Roraima
Atlético Saguntino, Spanish football team based in Sagunto, in the Valencian Community
Atlético San Cristóbal, earlier Venezuelan professional football club
Atlético San Francisco, simply known as Brujos, Mexican professional football club based in San Francisco del Rincón, Guanajuato, México
Atlético San Luis, Mexican football club based in San Luis Potosí
Atletico San Paolo Padova, now known as Tombolo Vigontina San Paolo F.C., Italian football team of the city of Tombolo and Vigonza, Veneto
Atlético Sanluqueño CF, Spanish football team based in Sanlúcar de Barrameda, Province of Cádiz, in the autonomous community of Andalusia
Atlético Semu, Equatoguinean football club based in the city of Malabo
Atletico Tanger, Moroccan football club from Tangier in the Moroccan third division
Atlético Tarazona, Spanish football team based in Tarazona de la Mancha, Albacete in the autonomous community of Castile-La Mancha
Atlético Tetuán, earlier Spanish football club based in Tétouan, Spanish protectorate of Morocco
Atlético Torino, Peruvian football club, playing in the city of Talara
Atlético Tucumán, Argentinian football club based in the city of San Miguel de Tucumán of Tucumán Province
Atlético Ultramar, East Timorese football club based in Manufahi, Same District, East Timor
Atlético Uruguay, Argentine football club, located in Concepción del Uruguay, Entre Ríos Province
Atlético Valdemoro, Spanish football club based in Valdemoro, in the autonomous community of Madrid
Atletico Vega Real, Dominican football team based in La Vega, Dominican Republic
Atletico Valladolid later BM Valladolid, Spanish handball team based in Valladolid, Castilla and León
Atlético Venezuela C.F., Venezuelan football club, founded and promoted to Venezuelan league in 2009 and 2012, based in Caracas playing in Segunda División Venezolana
Atlético Veracruz, Mexican football club based in Boca del Río, Veracruz
Atlético Villacarlos, Spanish football club that play in the Regional Preferente de Menorca
Atlético Zacatepec, earlier Mexican football team based in Zacatepec, Morelos
Atlético Zulia Fútbol Club, Venezuelan professional club and the club has won one First Division title in the professional era. The club was based in Maracaibo
AS Atletico Calcio, or Associazione Sportiva Atletico Calcio, earlier Italian football club based in Cagliari and Villasor, Sardinia  1963–2008.
Alianza Atlético de Sullana, Peruvian football club, located in the city of Sullana, Piura
Granada Atlético CF, Spanish football team based in Granada, in the autonomous community of Andalusia
Grêmio Atlético Coariense, commonly known as Grêmio Coariense, Brazilian football club based in Coari, Amazonas state
Jaboticabal Atlético, commonly known as Jaboticabal, inactive Brazilian football club based in Jaboticabal, São Paulo state
Lorca Atlético Club de Fútbol, earlier Spanish football team based in Lorca, in the Region of Murcia
Sevilla Atlético, Spanish football team based in Seville in the autonomous community of Andalusia

Atlético Clube
Atlético Clíper Clube, commonly known as Clíper, Brazilian football club based in Manaus, Amazonas
Atlético Clube Coríntians, or Coríntians, Brazilian soccer club based in the city Caicó in the state of Rio Grande do Norte,
Atlético Clube Goianiense, usually known as Atlético Goianiense or just as Atlético, Brazilian football team from the city of Goiânia, Goiás state
Atlético Clube Juventus, commonly known as Juventus do Acre, Brazilian football club based in Rio Branco, Acre
Atlético Clube Lagartense, commonly known as Lagartense, Brazilian football club based in Lagarto, Sergipe state

Atlético Deportivo
Atlético Deportivo Olímpico, Peruvian football club, playing in the city of Callao, Lima, Peru

Atlético Sport
Atlético Sport Aviação, best known as ASA, Angolan football club from Luanda, Angola

Atléticos
Atléticos de Levittown FC, Puerto Rican football club which played in the now defunct Campeonato Nacional de Fútbol de Puerto Rico
Atléticos de San Germán, Puerto Rican basketball club of the Baloncesto Superior Nacional (BSN) based in San Germán, Puerto Rico

CD Atlético
CD Atlético Baleares, Spanish football team based in Palma, Majorca
CD Cristo Atlético is a Spanish football team based in Palencia, in the autonomous community of Castile and León
CD Motril Atlético, Spanish football team based in Motril, Granada

Club Atletico / Club Atlético / CA
Club Atlético Aguada, commonly known as simply Aguada, Uruguyan basketball team based in Montevideo
Club Atlético Aldosivi, usually simply Aldosivi, Argentine sports club based in the city of Mar del Plata, Buenos Aires Province
Club Atlético Alto Perú, Uruguayan football club from Montevideo
Club Atlético Alvear, or Club Alvear, earlier Argentine football club affiliated to Argentine Football Association during the 1920s and 1930s
CA Antoniano, or Club Atlético Antonianio, Spanish football team based in Lebrija, Province of Seville, in the autonomous community of Andalusia
Club Atlético Argentino de Junín, known simply as Argentino de Junín, Argentine basketball club based in Junín, Buenos Aires Province
Club Atletico Argentino de Quilmes, or Argentino de Quilmes, Argentine football club from Quilmes, Buenos Aires
Club Atlético Atlanta, Argentine sports club from the Villa Crespo district of Buenos Aires. Nicknamed Los Bohemios ("The Bohemians"), Atlanta
Club Atlético Banco de la Nación Argentina, also known as Club Banco Nación, Argentine sports club, located in the neighborhood of Vicente López, in the homonymous partido of Greater Buenos Aires
Club Atlético Banfield, Argentine sports club based in the Banfield district of Greater Buenos Aires
Club Atlético Belgrano, mostly known simply as Belgrano or Belgrano de Córdoba, Argentine sports club from the city of Córdoba
Club Atlético Bella Vista, usually known simply as Bella Vista, Uruguayan football club based in Montevideo
Club Barcelona Atlético, Dominican Republic football club
Club Atlético Basáñez, or just Basáñez, Uruguayan football and boxing club in Montevideo, Uruguay
Club Atlético Chacarita Juniors, usually known simply as Chacarita, Argentine football club headquartered in Villa Crespo, Buenos Aires
Club Atlético Claypole, Argentine football club located in Claypole, Buenos Aires
Club Atlético Colegiales, usually just Atlético Colegiales or simply Colegiales, Paraguayan football club from 4 Mojones, Paraguay
Club Atlético Colón, commonly referred to as Colón de Santa Fe, Argentine sports club from Santa Fe, Argentina
Club Atlético Corrales, usually Atlético Corrales, earlier Paraguayan football club based in Asunción, Paraguay
Club Atletico Defensores Unidos, or presently Defensores Unidos, Argentine football club from the Villa Fox district of Zárate, Buenos Aires
Club Atlético Douglas Haig, Argentine football club from Pergamino, Buenos Aires Province
Club Atlético Fénix, Argentine football club from Pilar, Buenos Aires Province
Club Atlético Goes, Uruguayan basketball team located in Montevideo
Club Atlético Huracán, Argentine sports club from the Parque Patricios neighbourhood of Buenos Aires
Club Atlético Independiente, Argentine sports club, which has its headquarters and stadium in the city of Avellaneda in Greater Buenos Aires
Club Atletico Juventud de Las Piedras, Uruguayan sports club from Las Piedras, Canelones, Uruguay
Club Atlético Lanús, Argentine sports club from the Lanús district of Greater Buenos Aires
Club Atlético Nueva Chicago, Argentine football club in the Primera B Nacional
Club Atlético Ñuñorco, Argentine football club located in Monteros of Tucumán Province
Club Atlético Olimpia or simply Olimpia, Uruguayan sports club founded 1918, from the Columbus neighborhood in the north of the Uruguayan capital city of Montevideo
Club Athletico Paranaense, Brazilian football team from Curitiba in Paraná
Club Atlético Palmaflor, best known as Atlético Palmaflor and named Municipal Vinto until 2019,  Bolivian football club based in Quillacollo.
Club Atlético Patronato de la Juventud Católica, commonly called Patronato or Patronato de Paraná, Argentine football club based in Paraná
Club Atlético Peñarol, also known as Carboneros, Aurinegros and (familiarly) Manyas — Uruguayan sports club from Montevideo
Club Atlético de Pinto, or CA Pinto, Spanish football team based in Pinto, in the autonomous community of Madrid
Club Atlético Porteño, Argentine rugby union club sited in San Vicente, Buenos Aires
Club Atlético Provincial, also known as Provincial de Rosario, Argentine sports club located in the city of Rosario, Santa Fe
Club Atlético River Plate, commonly known as River Plate, Argentine professional sports club based in the Núñez neighborhood of Buenos Aires
Club Atlético River Plate (Montevideo), Uruguayan football club based in Montevideo
Club Atlético San Lorenzo, commonly known as San Lorenzo de Almagro or simply San Lorenzo, Argentine sports club
Atlético Club San Martín de Mendoza, popularly known as San Martín de Mendoza, Argentine football club from the city of San Martín in Mendoza Province, Argentina
Club Atlético San Miguel, Argentine sports club from San Miguel, Buenos Aires 
Club Atlético San Telmo, Argentine sports club located in the neighbourhood of San Telmo, in the City of Buenos Aires
Club Atlético Vélez Sarsfield, Argentine sports club based in Liniers, Buenos Aires

Clube Atlético / Atlético Clube
Clube Atlético Aliança, commonly known as Aliança, Brazilian football club based in Santana, Amapá state
Clube Atlético da Barra da Tijuca, commonly known as Barra da Tijuca, Brazilian football club based in Rio de Janeiro, Rio de Janeiro state
Clube Atlético Carazinho, commonly known as Atlético Carazinho, Brazilian football club based in Carazinho, Rio Grande do Sul state
Club Atletico Chaco For Ever, or just Chaco For Ever, Argentine Football club, their home town is Resistencia, in the Province of Chaco
Clube Atlético Hermann Aichinger, or Atlético Ibirama, inactive Brazilian football team from Ibirama in Santa Catarina
Clube Atlético Itapemirim, commonly known as Atlético Itapemirim, Brazilian football club based in Itapemirim, Espírito Santo state
Clube Atlético Mineiro and colloquially as Galo, Brazilian football club based in Belo Horizonte, Minas Gerais
Clube Atlético Monte Líbano (basketball), abbreviated as C.A. Monte Líbano and CAML, Brazilian men's basketball club that is based in São Paulo
Clube Atlético Portal, commonly known as CAP Uberlândia, Brazilian football club based in Uberlândia, Minas Gerais state
Clube Atlético Sorocaba, usually known as Atlético Sorocaba, inactive Brazilian football club from Sorocaba
Clube Atlético Taguatinga, commonly known as Atlético Taguatinga, or even Taguatinga, earlier Brazilian football club based in Núcleo Bandeirante, in Distrito Federal, Brazil
Club Atlético Tigre, popularly known as The Killer or simply Tigre, Argentine sports entity located in Victoria, Buenos Aires, Argentina
Clube Atlético Tricordiano, or simply Tricordiano, Brazilian currently inactive football team from Três Corações, Minas Gerais
Clube Atlético Tubarão, Brazilian football team from Tubarão, Santa Catarina
Club Atletico Victoriano Arenas, or Victoriano Arenas, Argentine sports club located in the Avellaneda district of Greater Buenos Aires
Alagoinhas Atlético Clube, or Atlético de Alagoinhas, Brazilian football club based in Alagoinhas, Bahia
Apucarana Atlético Clube, usually known simply as Apucarana, Brazilian football team from the city of Apucarana, Paraná state
Bauru Atlético Clube, commonly known as Bauru, earlier Brazilian football club based in Bauru, São Paulo state
Casa Pia Atlético Clube, Portuguese football team in LigaPro founded in 1920 and based in Lisbon, Portugal
Concórdia Atlético Clube, usually known simply as Concórdia, Brazilian football club from Concórdia, Santa Catarina
Coxim Atlético Clube, commonly known as Coxim, Brazilian football team based in Coxim, Mato Grosso do Sul state
Cristal Atlético Clube, also known as Cristal, Brazilian football team from Macapá, Amapá
Jacareí Atlético Clube, commonly known as Jacareí, is a currently inactive Brazilian football club based in Jacareí, São Paulo state
Nacional Atlético Clube (MG), commonly known as Nacional de Muriaé, Brazilian football club based in Muriaé, Minas Gerais state
Olaria Atlético Clube, usually abbreviated to Olaria, Brazilian football team based in the city of Rio de Janeiro
Paissandu Atlético Clube, commonly known as Paissandu, Brazilian sports club from the Brazilian metropolis of Rio de Janeiro
Quilmes Atlético Club, Argentine sports club based in the Quilmes district of Greater Buenos Aires
Três Passos Atlético Clube, commonly known as Três Passos, Brazilian football club based in Três Passos, Rio Grande do Sul state
União Suzano Atlético Clube, or simply União Suzano, Brazilian football team based in Suzano, São Paulo
Yale Atlético Clube, usually called Yale, one of the first sports club in Belo Horizonte, Minas Gerais, Brazil

Club Deportivo Atlético / CD  / SD
A.S.D. Atletico Elmas, Italian association football club located in Elmas, Sardinia. It currently plays in Promozione Sardinia
C.D. Atlético Nacional, Salvadoran football club based in San Luis Talpa, El Salvador
C.S.D. Independiente del Valle, known simply as Independiente del Valle or Independiente, Ecuadorian football club based in Sangolquí, Ecuador
S.D. Atlético Nacional, Panamanian football team based in Panama City

CF Atletico / FC Atletico
AFC Atletico Vaslui, earlier Romanian football club based in Vaslui, Vaslui County
CF Atlético Ciudad, earlier Spanish football club based in Murcia, in the autonomous community of Murcia.
FC Atlético Cearense, Brazilian football club based in Fortaleza, Ceará state
FC Barcelona B, Spanish football club, formerly known as FC Barcelona Atlétic
FCF Atlético Jiennense, Spanish football club from Jaén

Union Deportiva Atletico / UD Atletico
U.S.D. Atletico Catania, Unione Sportiva Dilettantistica Atletico Catania, Italian association football club founded in 1967 and based in Catania, Sicily
UD Las Palmas Atlético, or Unión Deportiva Las Palmas Atlético is the reserve team of UD Las Palmas, club based in Las Palmas, in the autonomous community of the Canary Islands

Various
Centro Atlético S.C. (usually called Centro Atlético), earlier Venezuelan professional football club
Instituto Atlético Central Córdoba, commonly referred as Instituto or Instituto de Córdoba, Argentine sports club from the city Córdoba
Ottawa South United or OSU Atlético, a club of Atlético Madrid
Paris 13 Atletico, French football club based in the 13th arrondissement of Paris, previously known as FC Gobelins
Sociedade Atlético Ceilandense, commonly known as Atlético Ceilandense, Brazilian football club based in Ceilândia, Distrito Federal

See also
"Atletico" (song), full title "Atletico (The Only One)", a song by Rae Morris
Atletico Partick, Scottish TV sitcom that aired on BBC from 1995 to 1996